The Heiwadai Bowl (平和台ボウル) is an annual college football bowl game played in Japan between the champions of the Kyūshū Collegiate American Football Association and the Chushikoku Collegiate American Football Association. The winner of the Heiwadai Bowl advances in the West Japan postseason, with a chance to play in the Koshien Bowl. The game is regulated by the Japan American Football Association.

Game results

Player of the Game Awards

MVP
The most valuable player award was given from 1991 to 2009.

Fighting Spirit Award

References

 
American football in Japan
College football bowls
Annual sporting events in Japan
1985 establishments in Japan
Recurring sporting events established in 1985